Żółwieniec Transmitter (Radio Television Transmitting Centre Konin-Żółwieniec), is a guyed steel mast 320 m high, built in 1992. Put in the commune Ślesin in the Konin County, Greater Poland Voivodeship, in the vicinity of the north lakeside of Ślesin.

Transmitted Programmes

Digital Television MPEG-4

MUX 3*(KP) - Transmitters for Kuyavian-Pomeranian Voivodeship

Radio

External links
 http://emi.emitel.pl/EMITEL/obiekty.aspx?obiekt=DODR_W1E
 http://radiopolska.pl/wykaz/pokaz_lokalizacja.php?pid=123
 http://www.przelaczenie.eu/mapy/wielkopolskie

Radio masts and towers in Poland
Konin County
1992 establishments in Poland
Towers completed in 1992